The Mind Beyond is a BBC2 supernatural anthology television series – part of BBC 2's Playhouse series – which ran from September to November 1976. It was produced by Irene Shubik and consists of 6 episodes. A book of the same name was also published to accompany the series.

Episode list

References

External links
The Mind Beyond (BFI Film and TV Database)
The Mind Beyond ("Haunted TV")

1976 British television series debuts
1976 British television series endings
1970s British drama television series
British supernatural television shows
BBC television dramas
1970s British anthology television series
English-language television shows